Khoresh or Khoresht is a generic Iranian term for stew dishes in the Iranian cuisine, Afghan cuisine, Tajik cuisine and also Kurdish cuisine. The word is a substantive of the verb khordan "to eat" and literally means "meal". 

It generally refers to different stews in the Iranian, Afghan and Kurdish cuisine, and is typically served beside polo (rice). In Iranian cuisines there are many different khoresh with many unique ingredients. Vegetarian khoreshes are common. Iranian stews use desired amounts of saffron to give a distinctive and fragrant taste. The most popular khoreshes in Iranian cuisine are gheimeh, ghormeh sabzi and fesenjan.

Varieties

Khoresh bademjan (eggplant stew): including eggplants, optional boned leg of lamb or stewed beef, onions, turmeric, tomato paste and medium tomatoes
 Khoresh bādemjān lapeh (aubergine and yellow split pea stew): same as previous with addition of yellow split peas and Advieh
 Khoresh bāmieh (okra tomato stew): Stewing lamb or beef, okra, potatoes, onions, fresh lime juice and tomato paste
 Khoresh bāmieh lapeh (okra and yellow split pea stew): same as previous with addition of yellow split peas and Advieh
 Khoresh beh (quince stew): chunks of lamb are stewed with slices or cubes of tart quince, and yellow split peas; this dish is always served with rice.
 Khoresh ālu  (prune stew)
 Khoresh ālu esfenaj (prune and spinach stew)
Khoresht e khalal (almond beef stew): a local stew of the city of Kermanshah in west of Iran, its ingredients are onion, lamb, and mutton in very small sizes, saffron, and lots of almonds slices. Local oil (roghan kermanshahi) can also be used.
 Khoresh fesenjān or fesenjun (pomegranate stew) including duck or chicken, or beef meatballs, ground walnuts, onions, pomegranate molasses, sugar
 Khoresh havij (carrot stew)
 Khoresh kadu (zucchini stew): pan-fried whole or long-cut sliced zucchini, stewed lamb, beef or chicken, onions, tomato paste and whole or split pan-fried tomatoes
 Khoresh qārch  (mushroom stew)

 Khoresh gheimeh (split-pea lamb stew) including stewed lamb or beef, Split-peas, onions, potatoes, tomato paste and dried limes
 Khoresh ghormeh sabzi (fresh herb and lamb stew) including red kidney or black-eyed beans, fresh fenugreek, parsley, coriander or parsley, spring onions or leeks, boned leg of lamb, onion and dried limes
 Khoresh kangar
 Khoresh karafs (celery beef stew) including lamb or beef, celery, onions, fresh lime juice, mint, and parsley
 Khoresh lubia sabz (green bean stew)
 Khoresh rivās (rhubarb stew)
 Khoresh vij vij (meat and veggies stew)

Salt, pepper, advieh, and oil are also used in these dishes.

See also
 List of stews

References

Iranian stews
Persian words and phrases
Kurdish cuisine
Tajik cuisine
Afghan cuisine